Progress M-18M, identified by NASA as Progress 50P, is a Progress spacecraft used by Roskosmos to resupply the International Space Station during 2013. Progress M-18M was sent on a four-orbit rendezvous profile that was already demonstrated by the Progress M-16M and Progress M-17M spacecraft in 2012.

Launch
The spacecraft was launched on time at 14:41:46 UTC on 11 February 2013 from the Baikonur Cosmodrome in Kazakhstan.

Docking

Progress M-18M docked with the Pirs at 20:35 UTC less than six hours after the launch. The successful docking climaxed the third successful Same-Day-Rendezvous in the International Space Station history.

Cargo

Undocking and reentry

Progress M-18M undocked from the ISS on 25 July 2013. The re-entry procedure started around 23:53 UTC, on 25 July 2013. The destruction occurred at 00:42 UTC, on 26 July 2013 in the Pacific Ocean.

References 

Progress (spacecraft) missions
Spacecraft launched in 2013
Spacecraft which reentered in 2013
Spacecraft launched by Soyuz-U rockets
Supply vehicles for the International Space Station